= Sandra Nadege =

Rwandan author and poet

Sandra Nadege Uwayezu
- Education: Southern New Hampshire University
- Occupations: Author, poet
- Notable work: The First Creation, Sense and Sensation, Light in the Dark

Sandra Nadege Uwayezu is a Rwandan author and poet based in Kigali. Nadege is the author of various poetry collections such as 'The First creation', 'Sense and Sensation' and a memoir titled 'Light in the Dark' .

She has been published in multiple magazines such as WSA magazine and The Swala Tribe. And also published on Rwandan medias include The New Times Rwanda.

== Early life and education ==
Born and raised in Kigali, the capital city of Rwanda, Nadege's childhood entailed experiences of self-isolation and depression, which sparked inspiration for her to start writing poems to express her thoughts and journey to healing. She finished her secondary studies from Saint Andre, and she is currently pursuing her Business Communication bachelor's degree at Southern New Hampshire University through Kepler University based in Kigali.

== Career ==
As a way of dealing trauma and depression from discrimination she faced in high school, in 2020 Nadege finished and published her first book titled First Creation, a collection of poetry. Nadege published her second book in November 2021, Light in the Dark, a short memoir of her story from 9 years to 16 years of age.

== Books ==
- First Creation
- Light in the Dark
